Vinni Parish is a rural municipality of Estonia, in Lääne-Viru County.

Settlements
There are 6 small boroughs: Laekvere, Pajusti, Roela, Tudu, Vinni, Viru-Jaagupi, and 37 villages, including: Aarla, Aasuvälja, Alavere, Allika, Anguse, Aravuse, Arukse, Aruküla, Aruvälja, Ilistvere, Inju, Kaasiksaare, Kadila, Kakumäe, Kannastiku, Kantküla, Karkuse, Kaukvere, Kehala, Kellavere, Koeravere, Kõrma, Kulina, Küti, Lähtse, Lavi, Lepiku, Luusika, Mäetaguse, Männikvälja, Miila, Mõdriku, Mõedaka, Moora, Muuga, Nõmmise, Nurkse, Nurmetu, Obja, Paasvere, Padu, Palasi, Piira, Põlula, Puka, Rahkla, Rajaküla, Rasivere, Ristiküla, Rohu, Rünga, Saara, Sae, Salutaguse, Sirevere, Soonuka, Sootaguse, Suigu, Tammiku, Uljaste, Ulvi, Vana-Vinni, Vassivere, Veadla, Venevere, Vetiku, Viru-Kabala, Võhu, and Voore.

Religion

References

External links